Crescent Beach in Lockeport, Nova Scotia, Canada is a white sand beach causeway that connects the peninsula of Lockeport to mainland Nova Scotia. Due to the town's proximity to the beach and closeness to major shipping lanes, Lockeport is often referred to as the 'Beachtown of the North Atlantic'. Crescent Beach was featured on the Canadian 1954 series fifty-dollar bill. The scenery on the bill depicts a stormy day at Ginger Hill.

Crescent Beach Centre
The Crescent Beach is also home to an interpretative centre. Its displays include a history of the town, First nation's fishing techniques, and a collection of marine oddities, such as swordfish eyes, and shark jaws. There is a selection of artifacts on hand, and there are also a number of interactive exhibits for children and adults.

In addition to the interpretive centre, the Crescent Beach Centre is also home to a visitor information centre.

Beaches of Nova Scotia